Zapped! is a 1982 American teen sex comedy film directed by Robert J. Rosenthal and co-written with Bruce Rubin. The film stars Scott Baio as a high school student who acquires telekinetic powers.

Plot

At Ralph Waldo Emerson High School, bookish student Barney Springboro (Scott Baio) performs various scientific experiments on laboratory mice until his friend, yearbook photographer Peyton Nichols (Willie Aames), retrieves him for a class assembly. Peyton questions Barney's lack of interest in finding a girlfriend as the students rally in preparation for an upcoming baseball game against a rival high school. Afterward, Peyton seduces one of the school administrators, Corrine Updike, and Barney returns to his experiments.

At the insistence of the pesky class president, Bernadette (Felice Schachter), Peyton promises to take photographs of Barney posing with the genetically modified orchids he has been growing for the school principal, Walter Coolidge. Barney drops the beaker containing the mice's feeding solution, producing a cloud of shimmery smoke that knocks him unconscious. Sometime later, he awakens and returns home, where his uptight mother chastises him for his tardiness and antisocial behavior. As she yells, Barney's bedroom door mysteriously slams shut. During English class the next day, Barney fantasizes about a popular but vain girl named Jane Mitchell (Heather Thomas). When the teacher calls on him unexpectedly, Barney furrows his brow, causing the map above the chalkboard to fall on her head.

That afternoon, Peyton asks Jane on a date, but she reminds him that she has a college-aged boyfriend. As Barney stares at Jane's chest, her cardigan bursts open, leaving everyone confused. In the lab, Barney experiments with his new telekinetic abilities by levitating various objects across the room, unaware of Bernadette and Peyton, who are watching through the window. When his friends confront him, however, Barney convinces them to keep his powers a secret. At home, Barney propels his model spaceship through the air, imagining the crew members inside have come alive. He then animates a ventriloquist dummy, which frightens Mrs. Springboro so much that she believes her son is possessed.

On the day of the big baseball game, Barney manipulates the ball and hits the winning home run. Meanwhile, Principal Coolidge attempts to break into Barney's lab to check the growth of his orchids, but cannot obtain the key. After Barney agrees to let Bernadette write a report about him for her older sister's college science journal, they notice Mrs. Burnhart sneak into his lab and uncover a pot of Peyton's marijuana hidden behind the orchids. She retrieves Principal Coolidge, but they return to discover the plants are missing. Baseball coach Dexter Jones finds Barney and Bernadette stuffing the plants in the incinerator, and the smoke causes him to become intoxicated: under the influence, he imagines riding a bicycle with Albert Einstein while being chased by his wife, who is dressed like a Viking warrior.

Over the weekend, Barney, Peyton, and Bernadette go to a pre-graduation celebration at an amusement park, during which Peyton challenges Jane's boyfriend, Robert Wolcott, to a beer-drinking contest and a carnival game that Peyton ends up winning. While on the Tilt-a-Whirl, Barney increases the speed of Robert's compartment, causing him to vomit and lose the bet. That night, Peyton brings Jane home and seduces her by pretending to act older and more mature. Meanwhile, Barney and Bernadette have dinner and talk about former crushes. The pair spend the next afternoon together in the park before returning to Barney's lab, where they make love.

At school on Monday, Jane admits that she regrets having sex with Peyton and returns to her boyfriend. Robert, however, invites Peyton to a casino-themed college fraternity party with the hopes of winning the money that he owes him for the drinking contest. Peyton begs Barney to attend so he can manipulate the roulette wheel, but Bernadette becomes angry that he would use his powers to gamble. Meanwhile, Mrs. Updike convinces Principal Coolidge to respond to a personal advertisement in the newspaper to meet a woman for a date.

At the restaurant, Principal Coolidge discovers that his date is Rose Burnhart, and the two finally succumb to their long-time attraction by having sex under the table. During the fraternity party, Barney attempts to manipulate the roulette ball, but struggles. He realizes Robert is manipulating the wheel himself by using a button to make it stop, and Barney's attempt to balance out the cheating causes a commotion among the guests when he accidentally levitates the entire wheel. When Bernadette refuses to answer his telephone calls, he spends the night in his laboratory drinking whiskey. Hung over the next morning, he apologizes to Bernadette and arranges to meet her at the prom that evening. Before he leaves for the dance, however, Mrs. Springboro hires two priests to perform an exorcism on her son, and Barney uses his ventriloquist dummy to chase them around the house so he can get away.

Peyton and Jane are crowned prom king and queen, and Jane rejects Peyton's continued advances. Peyton realizes that Jane is nothing but a snob, because nothing he does is good enough for her. As Barney dances with Bernadette, Peyton ruins the moment by offering his friend airplane tickets to Las Vegas where they can continue gambling, but Barney rejects the offer.  When Robert confronts Peyton about the roulette game, Peyton apologizes and gives him a packet of nude photographs he took of Jane. Enraged, Robert attacks, and Barney uses telekinesis to summon a large gust of wind that tears off the students' clothes and sends everybody running outside. Barney also uses his telekinesis to take down Robert and his friends and humiliate Jane by stripping off her prom dress; as she is laughed at, she runs away in shame.  A wayward fire hose knocks Barney unconscious and after he wakes, he pretends he has lost his powers. However, while leaving the school, Barney grabs Bernadette by the waist and propels them through the night sky in a cloud of shimmery dust.

Cast

 Scott Baio as Barney Springboro
 Willie Aames as Peyton Nichols
 Felice Schachter as Bernadette
 Heather Thomas as Jane Mitchell
 Robert Mandan as Principal Walter J. Coolidge
 Greg Bradford as Robert Wolcott
 Scatman Crothers as Coach Dexter Jones
 Sue Ane Langdon as Rose Burnhart
 Roger Bowen as Mr. Springboro
 Marya Small as Mrs. Springboro
 Merritt Butrick as Gary Cooter
 Ed Deezen as Sheldon
 LaWanda Page as Mrs. Jones
 Corine Bohrer as Cindy
 Jan Leighton as Albert Einstein
 Bryan O'Byrne as Father Murray
 Ed Bakey as Father Gallagher

Production
The film used several techniques to capture the feel of its high school setting for nostalgic fans. It was filmed largely at John Marshall High School in Los Angeles during the spring of 1981 with the students as extras. The storyline rarely leaves the high school. The students talk mostly about social life and college plans, while the prom is in the gym. The senior trip is to the local amusement park. Of the major stars, however, only Felice Schachter was still a high school student when the film was shot. In fact, she missed her own prom to shoot the prom sequence in the film.

The film used a body-double for Thomas' nude scenes, as she refused to remove her own clothes; further controversy was generated when a complaint was filed by Thomas about a likeness of her head being pasted onto someone else's nude body.

Baio and Aames would work together again the following year on the sitcom Charles in Charge.

Music
The film's soundtrack was composed by Charles Fox and Miles Goodman as well as John M. Keane and Tom Keane of The Keane Brothers, and featured performances by Joe "Bean" Esposito ("Updike's Theme") and David Pomeranz ("Got to Believe in Magic", "King and Queen of Hearts"), which were big hits in the Philippines.

Release

Box office
Zapped! was given a limited release on July 23, 1982, earning $823,548 in that weekend, ranking number 17 in the domestic box office. On September 3, 1982, the film was released wide and made $3,012,431, ranking number 4 behind An Officer and a Gentlemans sixth weekend, E.T. the Extra-Terrestrials thirteenth weekend, and Fast Times at Ridgemont Highs fourth weekend. By the end of its run, Zapped! grossed $16,897,768.

Critical response
The film was panned by critics. On Rotten Tomatoes, the film has an approval rating of 6% based on 16 reviews, with an average rating of 2.9/10. On Metacritic, the film received a score of 10 based on 4 reviews, indicating "overwhelming dislike". Targeted towards teenage audiences, Zapped! received generally negative reviews at the time of its release. The film was denounced by The New York Times Vincent Canby, who said,

The Leader-Post of Regina, Saskatchewan displayed similar contempt:

The Pittsburgh Post-Gazette suggested that "it's hard to believe the writers of Zapped!, an absolutely abominable movie ... are even old enough to hold a pen." The Daily Courier added that it was "so puerile and uninspired that it makes Porky's seem like Ninotchka in comparison." The Montreal Gazette said that there was "nothing innately hilarious about telekinesis, but that didn't stop the creative geniuses in Hollywood from seeing if they could pervert it into a smirky adolescent experience." A review from the smaller Beaver County Times said, "it's enough to make [Baio's] young fans go Zzzzzz." A review that was published in the Toledo Blade was only slightly less negative, stating that it "has its moments, but they tend not to hang around together."

When asked to comment in 2014, Baio remembered the film fondly:

Great movie. Loved it then. Love it today. I get more people asking about that movie than anything, no lie. And I had a ball making that. A cute, fun teen movie, and it made money. And it had Scatman Crothers! He was a good guy, and supposedly he smoked pot every day. That's what I was told, but I don't actually know. But I got to work with Willie [Aames], and it was a great experience ... Good people. Good crew. Good director.

Accolades
Aames was nominated by for the Golden Raspberry Award for Worst Actor at the 3rd Golden Raspberry Awards for his performance in Zapped!, as well as his performance in Paradise, but lost to Laurence Olivier in Inchon.

Home media
Zapped! was initially released on VHS, CED videodisc, and on LaserDisc by Embassy Pictures in 1983, and later reissued by MGM Home Entertainment on VHS. It was released on DVD on February 12, 2008. In June 2008, 20th Century Fox Home Entertainment issued it as a double feature with Making the Grade.

In popular culture
A notable edition of The Onion shows a tuxedoed Baio holding multiple Oscars, with the spoof headline "Zapped! Sweeps Oscars!" In the Family Guy episode "Meet the Quagmires" Lois mentions going to see Zapped! so she and Peter can fantasize about Scott Baio and no one would be gay.

Sequel
Despite negative reviews, Zapped! sold heavily on home video. In 1990, it was followed by a direct-to-video sequel, Zapped Again! (with only Sue Ane Langdon returning from the original cast).

References

External links
 
 
 Interview on Heather Thomas controversy

1982 films
1982 comedy films
1980s high school films
1980s parody films
1980s science fiction comedy films
1980s sex comedy films
1980s teen comedy films
American high school films
American parody films
American science fiction comedy films
American sex comedy films
American teen comedy films
Embassy Pictures films
1980s English-language films
Films about telekinesis
Films scored by Charles Fox
Films scored by Miles Goodman
Films shot in Los Angeles
Teen sex comedy films
1980s American films